John Gilbert may refer to:

Religion
John Gilbert (bishop of St David's) (died 1397), Bishop of Hereford, 1375–1389
John Gilbert (archbishop of York) (1693–1761), Archbishop of York

Sports
Brian Gilbert (tennis) (John Brian Gilbert, 1887–1974), British tennis player
John Gilbert (cricketer, born 1910) (1910–1992), English cricketer
John Gilbert (cricketer, born 1816) (1816–1887), English cricketer
John Gilbert (baseball) (1864–1903), Major League Baseball shortstop
John Gilbert (rugby league), rugby league footballer of the 1970s and 1980s

Politicians
John Gilbert (MP for Derby), see Derby
John Gilbert, Baron Gilbert (1927–2013), British Labour Party politician
John Gilbert (Canadian politician) (1921–2006), NDP MP from Ontario
John I. Gilbert (1837–1904), New York politician
John Gilbert (alderman) (1871–1934), chairman of the London County Council

Others
John Gilbert (agent) (1724–1795), land agent and engineer
John Gibbs Gilbert (1810–1889), American comedian
John Davies Gilbert (1811–1854), English scientist
John Gilbert (naturalist) (1812–1845), British naturalist and explorer who worked with John Gould
Sir John Gilbert (painter) (1817–1897), British artist
Sir John Thomas Gilbert (1829–1898), Irish archivist and historian
John Gilbert (bushranger) (1842–1865), Australian bushranger
John Wesley Gilbert (1864–1923), African American trailblazer and archaeologist
John Gilbert (actor) (1897–1936), American actor of the silent film era
Johnny Gilbert (born 1924), American television game show presenter
John Gilbert (broadcaster) (1930–1998), from Canada
John Selwyn Gilbert (born 1943), former British television scriptwriter, director and producer
John Phil Gilbert (born 1949), U.S. federal judge
John Gilbert (film editor) (born c. 1960), New Zealand film editor
John Henry Gilbert (1901–1974), British philatelist
John J. Gilbert (born 1937), American zoologist

See also
Jack Gilbert (disambiguation)
Jonathan Gilbert (born 1967), American actor
John Graham-Gilbert (1794–1866), Scottish portrait painter and art collector